Julius Lederer (24 June 1821, in Vienna – 30 April 1870, Vienna) was an Austrian entomologist who specialised in Lepidoptera.
He travelled widely: to Andalusia in 1849 Carinthia with Johann von Hornig (1819–1886) in 1853, İzmir in 1864, Magnesia in 1865, Amasya and Turkey in 1866, Mersin and the Taurus Mountains in 1867, Lebanon in 1868 and the Balkans in 1870).

External links
BDHL Beitrag zur Schmetterlings-Fauna von Cypern, Beirut und einem Theile Klein-Asiens Wien 1855.Scan.

Austrian lepidopterists
1821 births
1870 deaths
19th-century Austrian zoologists